Bridge to Terabithia might refer to:
 Bridge to Terabithia (novel), a 1977 novel by Katherine Paterson
 Bridge to Terabithia (1985 film), a 1985 made-for-TV film adaptation of the novel
 Bridge to Terabithia (2007 film), a 2007 movie adaptation of the novel

See also
 Terebinthia (disambiguation)